Air Kiribati (pronounced Air ) is the flag carrier of the Republic of Kiribati and operates scheduled passenger services to 20 atolls spread over an area of 3.5m sq km.

It is headquartered at Bonriki International Airport on the island of Tarawa in the Gilbert Islands. The airline operates an international service from Tarawa to Tuvalu. Regional charter flights, medical evacuation, and search and rescue services are also undertaken by the airline.

History 

Air Kiribati was first established as Air Tungaru in 1977. The airline served all 16 domestic airports in Kiribati as well as Honolulu and Papeete with a Boeing 727. In 1996 Air Tungaru ceased operations and Air Kiribati was established to mainly service domestic points in Kiribati with a slew of smaller regional airliners. In 2002 the airlines first ATR 72–500 enters service, but is retired in 2004. In 2016, Air Kiribati commenced also domestic operations in the Line Islands, servicing from Kiritimati both Washington and Fanning islands. In 2017 Air Kiribati's first De Havilland Canada Dash 8-106 is delivered and in 2019 the first of two Embraer E190-E2s delivered to Air Kiribati.

Corporate affairs

Board 
Air Kiribati is governed by a board which directly reports to Tekeeua Tarati, the Minister for Information, Communication, Transport and Tourism Development (MICTTD).

Air Kiribati is 100% owned by the Government of Kiribati.

CEO 
On 31 July Kobebe Taitai was appointed as acting CEO.
 
In February 2020 Captain Philip Statham became CEO after Tarataake Teannaki moved to become Secretary for Information, Communications, Transport and Tourism Development. Air Kiribati is looking for a new CEO, after position vacant, since August 2021. The position is now only open to Kiribati nationals.

Regulatory oversight 
The Civil Aviation Authority of Kiribati known as a Civil Aviation Division is one of the Governmental divisions under the Ministry of Information, Communications, Transport and Tourism Development (MICTTD) and is responsible for all Aviation activities in the country.The primary aviation legislation used are:

 Aircraft Security Act 1990
 Civil Aviation Act 2004

The actual regulations used are primarily from New Zealand, the NZCARs.

Destinations 
As of 2022, Air Kiribati serves these destinations:

Abaiang - Abaiang Airport
 Abemama - Abemama Airport
 Aranuka - Aranuka Airport
 Arorae - Arorae Airport
 Beru Island - Beru Airport
 Butaritari - Butaritari Airport
 Kuria - Kuria Airport
 Maiana - Maiana Airport
 Makin- Makin Airport
 Marakei - Marakei Airport
 Nikunau - Nikunau Airport
 Nonouti - Nonouti Airport
 Tabiteuea North - Tabiteuea North Airport
 Tabiteuea South - Tabiteuea South Airport
 Tamana - Tamana Airport 
 Tarawa - Bonriki International Airport - Hub
 Kiritimati - Cassidy International Airport
 Tabuaeran - Tabuaeran Airport
 Teraina - Teraina Airfield

Fleet 
As of July 2022, Air Kiribati consists of following aircraft:

Fleet development

Embraer E190-E2 
In December 2019, the first Embraer E190-E2, in Air Kiribati livery, was delivered to the airline. The E190-E2 has been certified and registered to the Australian Civil Aviation Safety Authority (CASA) since the beginning of 2020.

The Embraer E190-E2 has a maximum range of 5,278 km (2,850 nm). It retains cockpit commonality with its predecessor - E190. E190 pilots will only require a 2.5 days transition training with no flight simulator time needed to be able to fly the E190-E2.

Air Kiribati acting CEO Danial Rochford previously pointed out that "the type's increased range deemed it a "perfect choice" for the carrier." Acting CEO Danial Rochford says that the E190-E2 will offer “opportunities to fly from Australia and New Zealand direct to Kiribati”.

The E190-E2 is able to operate every required route in the Air Kiribati network when it receives ETOPS 120 minutes certification  and also allow the airline to operate longer-haul domestic and international routes including connections that had so far been beyond the reach of its current fleet of turboprops.

The Kiribati Transport Minister stated: "non-stop operations between the capital Tarawa and Kiritmati (Christmas) island [sic] currently requires an international stop in Fiji. With a range of 2,850 nautical miles, the E190-E2 can operate throughout the country with non-stop routes."

Domestic Twin Otter 
In December 2007, the Kiribati Government approved a request by Air Kiribati to purchase two Canadian made Twin Otter aircraft. Each plane is reported to cost US$3.3 million, but Air Kiribati's previous CEO Baraniko Baaro reports the purchase is a wise move which will save money currently used for the frequent repairs the aging air fleet requires. In addition, the new planes boast higher fuel efficiency, have room for more passengers and cargo and require less runway length than the current fleet, which may be of benefit on the airstrips of Kiribati's outer islands.

Regional Dash 8 
Air Kiribati has received its first new Dash 8 100 series aircraft, which touched down at Bonriki International Airport from Canada on 31 October 2017.

Tarataake Teannaki (a previous CEO) said "The Dash 8 is expected to fly to Tabiteuea North, pick up passengers from the Southern Gilbert Islands who will be flown to Tabiteuea North via Air Kiribati’s smaller aircraft stationed on the island to pick passengers from the Southern Gilberts and vice versa.

ATR 72

On 29 May 2002, Air Kiribati received an ATR 72-202, leased from ATRiam Capital. Air Kiribati operated the aircraft until March 2004, when it was returned to ATRiam Capital.

References

External links
Official website 

Airlines of Kiribati
Airlines established in 1995
Government-owned airlines
1995 establishments in Oceania